Oppong is an Ashanti surname that originates in the Ashanti City-State. Notable people with the Ashanti surname include:

 Abena Oppong-Asare (born 1983), British Labour Party politician
Dominic Oppong (born 1986), Ghanaian-born Canadian soccer player.
 George Weah (born 1966), Liberian humanitarian, politician and footballer.
Kojo Oppong Nkrumah (born 1982), Ghanaian politician and Lawyer.
Akwasi Oppong Fosu , Ghanaian Politician.
 Bernice Oppong (1993), Linux Administrator based in the USA.

Surnames of Ashanti origin
Surnames of Akan origin